Hello are an English glam rock band. They originally recorded for the Bell Records label. 

The band's biggest success came in the UK and Germany in the mid-1970s, when their top 10 hits in the UK Singles Chart were "Tell Him" and "New York Groove".

Career
The core of Hello was founded around 1969, originally being called The Age. The band was started by Bob Bradbury, previously of The Flashback Berries, with Keith Marshall, Vic Faulkner, and Jeff Allen (brother of Chris Allen, alias Chris Cross of Ultravox).  For about a year, they backed singer Caroline Hall, before renaming themselves as Hello in 1971.  The group recorded "You Move Me" and "C'mon" in 1972 as well as "Another School Day" in 1973, all on Bell Records, although these were not hits.

Their biggest success arose in the UK and Germany in 1974 and 1975. Their top 10 hits in the UK Singles Chart were "Tell Him" (a cover of The Exciters 1963 hit) and "New York Groove", the latter of which was written by Argent band member Russ Ballard. "New York Groove" was later covered to provide a solo Billboard Hot 100 chart hit in the United States, for the rock guitarist Ace Frehley of the band Kiss. In Germany, Hello's subsequent singles "Star Studded Sham" (another Ballard composition) and "Love Stealer" both reached the top 20, but failed to chart in the UK where glam rock had largely fallen out of favour.

Hello appeared in the 1975 film Side by Side. Their first album, titled Keeps Us Off the Streets, was soon released. 
 
However, by 1979, with no recording contract, the band split up. Former guitarist Keith Marshall subsequently released a solo effort two years later, titled "Only Crying". It found a place in record charts worldwide.
Bassist Vic Faulkner reappeared in the 2000s and releasing albums. He currently lives in Spain.

On 22 October 1999, Bob Bradbury appeared on the Identity Parade on the BBC Television programme, Never Mind the Buzzcocks. According to the band's official website, in 2002, their original lead singer and rhythm guitarist Bradbury reformed the band with him as the sole remaining founding member.

Discography

Albums
Keeps Us Off the Streets - (1976)
Shine On Silver Light - (1977)
Hello Again - (1978)
Glam Rockers - (1996)
New York Groove - (1999)
The Glam Singles Collection - (2001)
Live - (2013)

Singles

List of songs
The following is a sortable table of all songs by Hello:

The column Song list the song title; bold means released as a single.
The column Writer(s) lists who wrote the song.
The column Time shows its length.
The column Album lists the album the song is featured on.
The column Producer lists the producer of the song.
The column Year lists the year in which the song was released.

Cover versions
Hello produced also a lot of cover version. Their originals are:

Hello songs covered by others

Personnel

Current members
Bob Bradbury (born Robert Bradbury, 14 January 1956, Tottenham) - lead vocals, rhythm guitar (1971-1979, 2002–present)
Simon Ellis - lead guitar, backing vocals (2002–present)
Corrie Shiells (born 16 November 1976, Hampstead London) - bass, backing vocals (2002–present)
Jake Bradbury - drums (2013–present)

Former members
Keith Marshall (born 5 June 1956, Hampstead, London) - lead guitar, harmonica, backing vocals (1971-1979)
Vic Faulkner (born Victor Faulkner, 27 February 1956,  Hampstead) - bass (1971-1979)
Jeff Allen (born Jeffrey Leon Allen, 8 March 1956, Tottenham)  -  drums (1971-1979)
Alex Budge - drums (2002–2013)

See also
List of performers on Top of the Pops
List of glam rock artists

Notes

References

External links
[ Hello's AMG web page]
Hello's official web page
Val Mabbs, Hello: Front room audition provided their first break, Record Mirror, 1972

English glam rock groups
Musical groups established in 1971
Musical groups disestablished in 1979
Musical groups reestablished in 2002